is a Japanese musician, best known as the bass guitarist and rhythm guitarist for the pop punk band Shonen Knife from 2006 to 2016. Before joining Shonen Knife, she was a guitarist and vocalist for the J-Pop groups Keihan Girl and Denki Candy.

Selected discography

With Keihan Girl:
 Keihan Rock (2002)
 Goodbye Thunderbird (2003)

With Denki Candy:
 Denki Candy (2006)
 Denki Shock (2007)

With Shonen Knife:
 Super Group (2008)
 Free Time (2010)
 Osaka Ramones (2011)
 Pop Tune (2012)
 Overdrive (2014)

With mophing people:
 alternative e.p (2022)

References

External links
 Shonen Knife Biography
 From Ritsuko Blog
 mophing people on Bandcamp

Shonen Knife members
Japanese rock bass guitarists
Japanese alternative rock musicians
Japanese punk rock musicians
Living people
Women bass guitarists
Year of birth missing (living people)
Place of birth missing (living people)
Women in punk